Pallium is an ecclesiastical vestment in the Catholic Church. The adjectival form of the word is "pallial". 
Pallium may also refer to:  
 For the Roman cloak, see Pallium (Roman cloak)
 For pallium in a neuroanatomy context, see Pallium (neuroanatomy)

In invertebrate zoology "pallium" is:
 Another word for the mantle of a mollusc
 An anatomical structure in a brachiopod

The word may also be used to describe:
 Part of the plumage of a bird

See also